KYLS (1450 AM) is a radio station licensed to Fredericktown, Missouri, which broadcasts at 1,000 watts. It airs a hot adult contemporary format and is branded as "K-Hits 94.3". The station is simulcast on an FM translator at 94.3 (K232FS). KYLS is owned by Dockins Broadcast Group, LLC.

History
The station began broadcasting on June 29, 1963, and held the call sign KFTW. Its call sign was changed to KYLS on August 11, 1997. It adopted a hot AC format branded "K-Hits 94.3" in 2018.

References

External links
K-Hits 94.3 Official Website
Dockins Broadcast Group Stations

YLS
Radio stations established in 1963
1963 establishments in Missouri
Hot adult contemporary radio stations in the United States